This is a list of mathematicians of Jewish-Ukrainian descent.

A 
 Naum Akhiezer
 Vladimir Arnold

C 
 Chudnovsky brothers

D 
 Vladimir Drinfeld

G 
 Felix Gantmacher
 Israel Gelfand
 Alexander Goncharov

K 
 Naum Krasner
 Mark Krasnoselsky
 Mark Krein

L 
 Evgenii Landis
 Boris Levin
 Leonid Levin
 Boris Levitan
 Jacob Levitzki

M 
 David Milman
 Pierre Milman
 Vitali Milman

N 
 Mark Naimark

S 
 Moses Schönfinkel
 Samuil Shatunovsky

Z 
 Oscar Zariski

math
Ukrainian mathematicians